Peterlee is a town in County Durham, England. It lies between Sunderland to the north, Hartlepool to the south, the Durham Coast to the east and Durham to the west. It gained town status in 1948 under the New Towns Act 1946. The act also created the nearby settlement of Newton Aycliffe and later Washington, Tyne and Wear.

History
The case for founding Peterlee as a new town was put forward in Farewell Squalor by Easington Rural District Council Surveyor C. W. Clarke, who also proposed that the town be named after the celebrated Durham miners' leader Peter Lee. It is one of the few places in the British Isles to be directly named after a recent individual, and unique among the post-Second World War new towns in having its existence requested by local people through their MP. A deputation, mostly if not wholly consisting of working miners, met the Minister of Town and Country Planning to put the case for a new town in the district. The Minister, Lewis Silkin, responded by offering a half-size new town of 30,000 residents. The subsequent new residents came largely from surrounding villages in the District of Easington.

Peterlee Development Corporation was founded in 1948, first under Dr Monica Felton, then under A.V. Williams.The original master plan for tower blocks of flats by Berthold Lubetkin was rejected as unsuitable for the geology of the area, which had been weakened by mining works, and he resigned in 1950. George Grenfell Baines replaced Lubetkin and began to build quickly, but the result was poor-quality construction. Williams invited an artist Victor Pasmore to head the design team for the landscaping.

Governance
Peterlee Town Council
Durham County Council

Mayor
The first elected mayor of Peterlee was William Whitehouse, who had previously worked on the council. Earlier he had been in the Royal Air Force and taught at a school in Horden.

Landmarks

Apollo Pavilion

The Apollo Pavilion (1970) was designed by Victor Pasmore. It provided a focal point for the Sunny Blunts estate as well as a bridge across a water-course. It was named after the Apollo moon missions.

From the late 1970s the Pavilion suffered from vandals and anti-social behaviour. The murals on the building faded, and to discourage anti-social behaviour, staircases were removed in the 1980s. In 1996, there was a failed attempt to list the Pavilion. English Heritage described it as "an internationally important masterpiece". However, some local residents and councillors saw the Pavilion as an eyesore and campaigned to have it demolished. The campaign appeared to have been successful when demolition was proposed in 2000. However, in July 2009 a six-month revamp programme was completed at a cost of £400,000. As part of this, original features such as the murals and stairs were reinstated.

In December 2011, English Heritage gave the pavilion a Grade-II* listing.

Transport

Road
Peterlee is served by the main A19 road running west of the town to Sunderland in the north and Hartlepool in the south, and the A1086 to its east leading to Easington in the north and Hartlepool to the south. The B1320 runs through the town centre linking the town to Horden and the A1086 in the east and Shotton Colliery and the A19 in the west. The B1432 to the north of the town centre leads to Easington Village, Hawthorn and Seaham on the route of the old A19. The A181 runs to the south-west of the town at the Castle Eden and Wingate junction on the A19 leading to Wheatley Hill, Thornley, and Durham. In 2008, the A688 was extended to the A181 at Running Waters from the A1(M) junction at Bowburn, creating a trunk road from Peterlee to the A1(M) via the A19, A181 and A688.

Buses
Peterlee is served by Arriva North East and Go North East in the local area, to Dalton Park, and to the towns and cities of Newcastle, Gateshead, Sunderland, Houghton-le-Spring, Durham, Hartlepool, Sedgefield, Newton Aycliffe, Billingham, Stockton, Middlesbrough and Darlington.

Rail
This station, which opened on 29 June 2020, replaced Horden's earlier station which closed in May 1964.

Education

Secondary
Dene Academy
The Academy at Shotton Hall
St Bede's Catholic School

Culture
Castle Eden Dene, most of which is within the boundaries of Peterlee, is a national nature reserve.

Town twinning
  Nordenham, Germany (since 1981)

Notable residents

Chris Brown, former Premier League footballer who was born in Doncaster but moved to Peterlee when young and attended The Academy at Shotton Hall
Courtney Hadwin (born 2004), award-winning teenage rock singer, has studied here. 
Mark Hoban (born 1964), politician, former Conservative MP for Fareham 
Gina McKee (born 1964), actress 
Crissy Rock (born 1958), Liverpool born actress and comedian who moved to the town
Roy Walker (born 1940), comedian and television presenter

References

 
Towns in County Durham
New towns in England
New towns started in the 1950s